Leeton Shire is a local government area in the Riverina region of New South Wales, Australia.  The Shire is located adjacent to the Murrumbidgee River and falls within the Murrumbidgee Irrigation Area.

The Shire includes the town of Leeton and the small towns of Yanco, Gogeldrie, Whitton, Wamoon, Stoney Point, Murrami, Corbie Hill, Amesbury, Merungle Hill, Fivebough and Stanbridge and the suburbs of Parkview, Wattle Hill, Wiradjuri, North Leeton, Gralee and Willimbong.

The shire was created on 6 January 1928 under the provisions of the Irrigation Act 1912 from land previously part of Yanko Shire and was originally called Willembong Shire. It was renamed as Leeton Shire on 10 July 1946.

The mayor of Leeton Shire is Paul Maytom.

Council

Current composition and election method
Leeton Shire Council is composed of nine councillors elected proportionally as a single ward. All Councillors are elected for a fixed four-year term of office. The mayor is elected by the councillors at the first meeting of the council. The most recent election was held on 10 September 2016, and the makeup of the council is as follows:

The current Council, elected in 2016, in order of election, is:

Heritage listings
Leeton Shire has a number of heritage-listed sites, including:
 Gogeldrie Weir
 Hydro Hotel
 Koonadan Historic Site
 Leeton District Lands Office
 Leeton District Office artefacts
 Leeton railway station
 Roxy Community Theatre
 Yanco Weir

References

 
Leeton, New South Wales
Local government areas of the Riverina
Local government areas of New South Wales
1928 establishments in Australia